Jyväskylä Arts Festival is an arts festival celebrated annually at Jyväskylä, Finland since 1956. It has since become one of the biggest arts festivals in Finland. Close to 40,000 people took part in the event in 2009.

References

External links
 

Festivals in Finland
Jyväskylä
Festivals established in 1956
Tourist attractions in Central Finland Region
1956 establishments in Finland